The 2012 United States presidential election in North Dakota took place on November 6, 2012, as part of the 2012 United States presidential election in which all 50 states plus the District of Columbia participated. North Dakota voters chose three electors to represent them in the Electoral College via a popular vote pitting incumbent Democratic President Barack Obama and his running mate, Vice President Joe Biden, against Republican challenger and former Massachusetts Governor Mitt Romney and his running mate, Congressman Paul Ryan.

Prior to the election, 17 news organizations considered this a state Romney would win, or otherwise considered as a safe red state. Mitt Romney handily won the state with 58.32% of the vote to Barack Obama's 38.70%, a 19.62% margin of victory. He flipped seven counties that were carried by Obama in 2008, including Cass County, home to Fargo, the state's largest city.

As of 2020, this is the most recent time a Democrat won Benson, Ransom, Sargent, and Steele counties.

Caucuses

Democratic

Republican

The 2012 North Dakota Republican caucuses were held on March 6, 2012. North Dakota has 28 delegates to the Republican National Convention; despite Rick Santorum's nominal win in the preference poll conducted during the caucuses, the majority of the delegates elected by the state party convention later in March said they supported Romney.

Convention controversy
North Dakota Republican Party had its state convention from Friday, March 30 to Sunday, April 1 where twenty-five unbound National Convention delegates were elected. Rick Santorum had won the strawpoll at the Legislative Districts caucuses on Super Tuesday with a large margin to Ron Paul in second place and Mitt Romney in third place. The party leaderships recommended slate of delegates was to reflect this strawpoll result. According to Santorum and Paul supporters the slate did not live up to this requirement, but gave Romney a large majority of the delegates. Former NDGOP Chairman Gary Emineth called the vote undemocratic and a railroad job.

General election

Polling

‡Likely primary voters

Predictions
 Real Clear Politics: Solid Romney 
 Huffington Post: Strong Romney
 CNN: Safe Romney
 New York Times: Strong Republican
 Washington Post: Solid Romney
 Karl Rove: Romney
 Freedom's Light House: Romney

Results

By county

Counties that flipped from Democratic to Republican

 Cass (largest city: Fargo)
 Eddy (largest city: New Rockford)
 Grand Forks (largest city: Grand Forks)
 Mountrail (largest city: Stanley)
 Nelson (largest city: Lakota)
 Towner (largest city: Cando)
 Traill (largest city: Mayville)

By congressional district
Due to the state's low population, only one congressional district is allocated. This district is called the At-Large district, because it covers the entire state, and thus is equivalent to the statewide election results.

See also
 United States presidential elections in North Dakota
 2012 Republican Party presidential debates and forums
 2012 Republican Party presidential primaries
 Results of the 2012 Republican Party presidential primaries
 North Dakota Republican Party

References

External links
North Dakota GOP website
North Dakota Republican State Committee Rules and Modes of Procedure
The Green Papers: for North Dakota
The Green Papers: Major state elections in chronological order

North Dakota
United States President
2012